Leslie Grace is the self-titled second studio album and first tropical album by American singer Leslie Grace. The album was released on June 25, 2013, by Top Stop Music. It debuted at number four on the Billboard Latin Albums chart, and number three on the Billboard Tropical Albums chart. A deluxe edition of the album was released on July 4, 2013.

Album information
Leslie Grace is Grace's first album since Pasión in 2009. It is the first album to be produced by Sergio George and released under his independent record label, Top Stop Music. It is George's first time working with a female bachata artist. The lead single, produced by George, "Will You Still Love Me Tomorrow", a bilingual, bachata cover of the 1961 The Shirelles hit, co-written by Carole King. Her version peaked number one on both the Billboard Tropical Songs chart and Billboard Latin Airplay charts, becoming the first female Latin artist to do so.

Track listing

Awards and recognitions
 The 2013 album was nominated for a Latin Grammy for Best Tropical Album. Grace was the only female artist to be nominated in this category.
 The album's third single "Be My Baby" was nominated for Song of the Year at the Premios Juventud awards.
 The album's success saw Grace receive a nomination at the Premio Lo Nuestro awards for the Female Tropical Artist of the Year.

Charts

Weekly charts

Year-end charts

References

2013 albums
Leslie Grace albums
Albums produced by Sergio George
Top Stop Music albums